Tillamook is an extinct Salishan language, formerly spoken by the Tillamook people in northwestern Oregon, United States. The last fluent speaker was Minnie Scovell who died in 1972.  In an effort to prevent the language from being lost, a group of researchers from the University of Hawaii interviewed the few remaining Tillamook-speakers and created a 120-page dictionary.

Phonology

Vowels

Consonants

Internal rounding

The acoustic effect of labialization is created entirely inside the mouth by cupping the tongue (sulcalization). Uvulars with this distinctive internal rounding have "a kind of  timbre" while "rounded" front velars have  coloring. These contrast and oppose otherwise very similar segments having  or  coloring—the "unrounded" consonants.

Notes

Bibliography

External links
University of Oregon: The Tillamook
 Tillamook Language

OLAC resources in and about the Tillamook language

Coast Salish languages
Indigenous languages of Oregon
Indigenous languages of the Pacific Northwest Coast
Extinct languages of North America
Languages extinct in the 1970s
1970s disestablishments in Oregon